Jurre Vreman (born 20 February 1998) is a Dutch professional footballer who plays for Woezik as a defender.

Club career
Vreman is a youth exponent from De Graafschap. He made his professional debut on 5 August 2016 in an Eerste Divisie game against FC Eindhoven.

References

Living people
1998 births
People from Oude IJsselstreek
Association football central defenders
Dutch footballers
De Graafschap players
SC Woezik players
Eerste Divisie players
Footballers from Gelderland